Hermann Günther Grassmann (15 April 1809 – 26 September 1877) was a German polymath known in his day as a linguist and now also as a mathematician. He was also a physicist, general scholar, and publisher. His mathematical work was little noted until he was in his sixties. His work preceded and exceeded the concept which is now known as a vector space. He introduced the Grassmannian, the space which parameterizes all k-dimensional linear subspaces of an n-dimensional vector space V.

Biography
Hermann Grassmann was the third of 12 children of Justus Günter Grassmann, an ordained minister who taught mathematics and physics at the Stettin Gymnasium, where Hermann was educated.

Grassmann was an undistinguished student until he obtained a high mark on the examinations for admission to Prussian universities. Beginning in 1827, he studied theology at the University of Berlin, also taking classes in classical languages, philosophy, and literature. He does not appear to have taken courses in mathematics or physics.

Although lacking university training in mathematics, it was the field that most interested him when he returned to Stettin in 1830 after completing his studies in Berlin. After a year of preparation, he sat the examinations needed to teach mathematics in a gymnasium, but achieved a result good enough to allow him to teach only at the lower levels. Around this time, he made his first significant mathematical discoveries, ones that led him to the important ideas he set out in his 1844 paper Die lineale Ausdehnungslehre, ein neuer Zweig der Mathematik, here referred to as A1.

In 1834 Grassmann began teaching mathematics at the Gewerbeschule in Berlin. A year later, he returned to Stettin to teach mathematics, physics, German, Latin, and religious studies at a new school, the Otto Schule. Over the next four years, Grassmann passed examinations enabling him to teach mathematics, physics, chemistry, and mineralogy at all secondary school levels.

In 1847, he was made an "Oberlehrer" or head teacher. In 1852, he was appointed to his late father's position at the Stettin Gymnasium, thereby acquiring the title of Professor. In 1847, he asked the Prussian Ministry of Education to be considered for a university position, whereupon that Ministry asked Ernst Kummer for his opinion of Grassmann. Kummer wrote back saying that Grassmann's 1846 prize essay (see below) contained "commendably good material expressed in a deficient form." Kummer's report ended any chance that Grassmann might obtain a university post. This episode proved the norm; time and again, leading figures of Grassmann's day failed to recognize the value of his mathematics.

Starting during the political turmoil in Germany, 1848–49, Hermann and his brother Robert published a Stettin newspaper, Deutsche Wochenschrift für Staat, Kirche und Volksleben, calling for German unification under a constitutional monarchy. (This eventuated in 1871.) After writing a series of articles on constitutional law, Hermann parted company with the newspaper, finding himself increasingly at odds with its political direction.

Grassmann had eleven children, seven of whom reached adulthood. A son, Hermann Ernst Grassmann, became a professor of mathematics at the University of Giessen.

Mathematician
One of the many examinations for which Grassmann sat required that he submit an essay on the theory of the tides. In 1840, he did so, taking the basic theory from Laplace's Traité de mécanique céleste and from Lagrange's Mécanique analytique, but expositing this theory making use of the vector methods he had been mulling over since 1832. This essay, first published in the Collected Works of 1894–1911, contains the first known appearance of what is now called linear algebra and the notion of a vector space. He went on to develop those methods in his A1 and A2.

In 1844, Grassmann published his masterpiece (A1) and commonly referred to as the Ausdehnungslehre, which translates as "theory of extension" or "theory of extensive magnitudes". Since A1 proposed a new foundation for all of mathematics, the work began with quite general definitions of a philosophical nature. Grassmann then showed that once geometry is put into the algebraic form he advocated, the number three has no privileged role as the number of spatial dimensions; the number of possible dimensions is in fact unbounded.

Fearnley-Sander describes Grassmann's foundation of linear algebra  as follows:

Following an idea of Grassmann's father, A1 also defined the exterior product, also called "combinatorial product" (in German: kombinatorisches Produkt or äußeres Produkt “outer product”), the key operation of an algebra now called exterior algebra. (One should keep in mind that in Grassmann's day, the only axiomatic theory was Euclidean geometry, and the general notion of an abstract algebra had yet to be defined.) In 1878, William Kingdon Clifford joined this exterior algebra to William Rowan Hamilton's quaternions by replacing Grassmann's rule epep = 0 by the rule epep = 1. (For quaternions, we have the rule i2 = j2 = k2 = −1.) For more details, see Exterior algebra.

A1 was a revolutionary text, too far ahead of its time to be appreciated. When Grassmann submitted it to apply for a professorship in 1847, the ministry asked Ernst Kummer for a report. Kummer assured that there were good ideas in it, but found the exposition deficient and advised against giving Grassmann a university position. Over the next 10-odd years, Grassmann wrote a variety of work applying his theory of extension, including his 1845 Neue Theorie der Elektrodynamik and several papers on algebraic curves and surfaces, in the hope that these applications would lead others to take his theory seriously.

In 1846, Möbius invited Grassmann to enter a competition to solve a problem first proposed by Leibniz: to devise a geometric calculus devoid of coordinates and metric properties (what Leibniz termed analysis situs). Grassmann's Geometrische Analyse geknüpft an die von Leibniz erfundene geometrische Charakteristik, was the winning entry (also the only entry). Möbius, as one of the judges, criticized the way Grassmann introduced abstract notions without giving the reader any intuition as to why those notions were of value.

In 1853, Grassmann published a theory of how colors mix; his theory's four color laws are still taught, as Grassmann's laws. Grassmann's work on this subject was inconsistent with that of Helmholtz. Grassmann also wrote on crystallography, electromagnetism, and mechanics.

In 1861, Grassmann laid the groundwork for Peano's axiomatization of arithmetic in his Lehrbuch der Arithmetik. In 1862, Grassmann published a thoroughly rewritten second edition of A1, hoping to earn belated recognition for his theory of extension, and containing the definitive exposition of his linear algebra. The result, Die Ausdehnungslehre: Vollständig und in strenger Form bearbeitet (A2), fared no better than A1, even though A2 manner of exposition anticipates the textbooks of the 20th century.

Response
In the 1840s, mathematicians were generally unprepared to understand Grassmann's ideas. In the 1860s and 1870s various mathematicians came to ideas similar to that of Grassmann's, but Grassmann himself was not interested in mathematics anymore.

Adhémar Jean Claude Barré de Saint-Venant developed a vector calculus similar to that of Grassmann, which he published in 1845. He then entered into a dispute with Grassmann about which of the two had thought of the ideas first. Grassmann had published his results in 1844, but Saint-Venant claimed that he had first developed these ideas in 1832.

One of the first mathematicians to appreciate Grassmann's ideas during his lifetime was Hermann Hankel, whose 1867 Theorie der complexen Zahlensysteme.

In 1872 Victor Schlegel published the first part of his System der Raumlehre, which used Grassmann's approach to derive ancient and modern results in plane geometry. Felix Klein wrote a negative review of Schlegel's book citing its incompleteness and lack of perspective on Grassmann. Schlegel followed in 1875 with a second part of his System according to Grassmann, this time developing higher-dimensional geometry. Meanwhile, Klein was advancing his Erlangen program, which also expanded the scope of geometry.

Comprehension of Grassmann awaited the concept of vector spaces, which then could express the multilinear algebra of his extension theory.  To establish the priority of Grassmann over Hamilton, Josiah Willard Gibbs urged Grassmann's heirs to have the 1840 essay on tides published.  A. N. Whitehead's first monograph, the Universal Algebra (1898), included the first systematic exposition in English of the theory of extension and the exterior algebra. With the rise of differential geometry the exterior algebra was applied to differential forms.

In 1995 Lloyd C. Kannenberg published an English translation of The Ausdehnungslehre and Other works. For an introduction to the role of Grassmann's work in contemporary mathematical physics see The Road to Reality by Roger Penrose.

Linguist
Grassmann's mathematical ideas began to spread only towards the end of his life. Thirty years after the publication of A1 the publisher wrote to Grassmann: “Your book Die Ausdehnungslehre has been out of print for some time. Since your work hardly sold at all, roughly 600 copies were used in 1864 as waste paper and the remaining few odd copies have now been sold out, with the exception of the one copy in our library”. Disappointed by the reception of his work in mathematical circles, Grassmann lost his contacts with mathematicians as well as his interest in geometry. The last years of his life he turned to historical linguistics and the study of Sanskrit. He wrote books on German grammar, collected folk songs, and learned Sanskrit. He wrote a 2,000-page dictionary and a translation of the Rigveda (more than 1,000 pages), which earned him a membership of the American Orientalists' Society. In modern
Rigvedic studies, Grassmann's work is often cited. In 1955 the third edition of his dictionary to Rigveda was issued.

Grassmann also noticed and presented a phonological rule that exists in both Sankskrit and Greek. In his honor, this phonological rule is known as Grassmann's law.

These philological accomplishments were honored during his lifetime; he was elected to the American Oriental Society and in 1876, he received an honorary doctorate from the University of Tübingen.

Publications
 A1: 
 
 
 
 
 A2:
1862. Die Ausdehnungslehre. Vollständig und in strenger Form begründet.. Berlin: Enslin.
 English translation, 2000, by Lloyd Kannenberg, Extension Theory, American Mathematical Society , 
 1873. Wörterbuch zum Rig-Veda. Leipzig: Brockhaus.
 1876–1877. Rig-Veda. Leipzig: Brockhaus. Translation in two vols., vol. 1 published 1876, vol. 2 published 1877.
 1894–1911. Gesammelte mathematische und physikalische Werke, in 3 vols. Friedrich Engel ed. Leipzig: B.G. Teubner. Reprinted 1972, New York: Johnson.

See also
Ampère's force law
Bra–ket notation (Grassmann was its precursor)
Geometric algebra
Multilinear algebra
List of things named after Hermann Grassmann

Citations

References
 
 
 
 
 
 
 
 
 
 
 
 
 
 

Note: Extensive online bibliography, revealing substantial contemporary interest in Grassmann's life and work. References each chapter in Schubring.

External links

 The MacTutor History of Mathematics archive:
 
 Abstract Linear Spaces. Discusses the role of Grassmann and other 19th century figures in the invention of linear algebra and vector spaces.
 Fearnley-Sander's home page.
 Grassmann Bicentennial Conference (1809 – 1877), September 16 – 19, 2009  Potsdam / Szczecin (DE / PL): From Past to Future: Grassmann's Work in Context
 "The Grassmann method in projective geometry" – A compilation of English translations of three notes by Cesare Burali-Forti on the application of Grassmann's exterior algebra to projective geometry
 C. Burali-Forti, "Introduction to Differential Geometry, following the method of H. Grassmann" (English translation of book by an early disciple of Grassmann)
 "Mechanics, according to the principles of the theory of extension" – An English translation of one Grassmann's papers on the applications of exterior algebra

1809 births
1877 deaths
Scientists from Szczecin
19th-century German mathematicians
Linear algebraists
Linguists from Germany
19th-century German physicists
People from the Province of Pomerania
Color scientists
Humboldt University of Berlin alumni
Translators from Sanskrit
19th-century translators